Opimihaw Creek is a small creek in Saskatchewan that flows into the South Saskatchewan River. It is situated immediately north of the city of Saskatoon and is a part of Wanuskewin Heritage Park, a local history museum, park, and National Historic Site that displays the culture of the local Plains Indian peoples, particularly the Cree.

The name comes from the Plains Cree word ᐅᐱᒥᐦᐋᐤ opimihâw meaning 'pilot' or literally ‘one which is swift’. The Plains Cree are one of many First Nations tribes to have inhabited the area, and the creek has a long and historic connection with Plains Indian peoples and their cultures.

Valley 
Opimihaw Creek is notable for its valley, which carves into the river bank and is filled by wetland and various fauna. Many First Nations people historically used the valley as a buffalo jump, and so it is a notable site for archaeology. There are around 20 dig sites situated around the creek in the Wanuskewin Heritage Park; some of the dig sites date back as far as 6,400 years, predating the Pyramids of Giza in Egypt.

References 

South Saskatchewan River